The 2006 Fort Lauderdale mayoral election was held on February 14, 2006,  to elect the mayor of Fort Lauderdale, Florida. It saw the reelection of Jim Naugle.

The election was nonpartisan.

Results

References 

Fort Lauderdale
Mayoral elections in Fort Lauderdale
Fort Lauderdale